Hypercalymnia is a genus of moths of the family Noctuidae. The genus was erected by George Hampson in 1909.

Afromoths gives this name as a synonym of Acontia Ochsenheimer, 1816.

Species
Hypercalymnia ampijoroa Viette, 1965 Madagascar
Hypercalymnia gloriosa (Kenrick, 1917) Madagascar
Hypercalymnia hausmanni (Hacker, 2010) Kenya
Hypercalymnia laurenconi Viette, 1965 Madagascar
Hypercalymnia malagasy Viette, 1965 Madagascar
Hypercalymnia metaxantha Hampson, 1910 Zaire, Rwanda, Tanzania
Hypercalymnia splendida (Rothschild, 1924) Madagascar
Hypercalymnia transducta (Viette, 1958) Madagascar
Hypercalymnia versicolorata (Hacker, 2010) Kenya, Ethiopia
Hypercalymnia paphos Viette, 1973 Madagascar
Hypercalymnia viridivariegata Berio, 1939 Ethiopia

References

Acontiinae